Worsley Alumina comprises a bauxite mine located near the town of Boddington and an Alumina refinery located near Worsley. Ore is mined then transported  to the refinery via an overland conveyor system. Alumina is then transported  to the port of Bunbury for shipping.

Bauxite Mine 
The Boddington Bauxite Mine is located south of the town of Boddington, and comprises the two sites of Saddleback and Marradong.
 

Alumina Refinery 
The refinery, also owned by South32, uses a four-stage Bayer Process to transform the red bauxite rock into white alumina powder. It is powered by coal, producing  of carbon per year averaged for 2017–2021, making it the fourth-biggest carbon polluter in Western Australia.

References

Further reading

Mines in Western Australia
Bauxite mines in Australia